Attenberg is a 2010 Greek drama film, written and directed by Athina Rachel Tsangari. The film was nominated for the Golden Lion at the 67th Venice International Film Festival and Ariane Labed won the Coppa Volpi for the Best Actress. It was filmed in the town of Aspra Spitia, in the Greek region of Boeotia. The film was selected as the Greek entry for the Best Foreign Language Film at the 84th Academy Awards, but it did not make the final shortlist.

Plot
Marina, a sexually inexperienced 23-year-old woman, lives with her terminally-ill architect father, Spyros, in an industrial Greek town by the sea where she works at the local steel mill.

Unable to relate to her fellow humans, she lives her life through the wildlife documentaries of Sir David Attenborough, the songs of Suicide and the sex education lessons given to her by her friend Bella.

Despite her sexual inexperience, Marina's relationships with her father and Bella show warmth and thought.  Spyros, contemplative as he approaches death, shares with her how he believes, "Man has designed ruins with mathematical accuracy..." referring to the destiny of most architecture, eventually.  But then cynically, he reflects that "We (Greece) went from sheep to bulldozers...".

When a stranger comes to town, an engineer who begins a work course at the steel mill, Marina has her first sexual relationship with him. She is secretive but shares her experience first with Spyros, and later with Bella.

As Spyros comes closer to death, Marina asks Bella to sleep with her father as a favor for the dying man, who has not been with a woman for a long time. Meanwhile, Marina begins a sexual relationship with the stranger.

The film reaches its conclusion after Spyros's demise, where the last scenes are of Bella and Marina scattering his ashes over the sea.

Cast
 Ariane Labed as Marina
 Vangelis Mourikis as Spyros
 Evangelia Randou as Bella
 Yorgos Lanthimos as the Engineer

Reception
Quentin Tarantino, who was head of the Jury for the 67th Venice International Film Festival, said that the film "grew on us the most, and showed another Greece". Journalist Shane Danielsen called the film "an intellectually rigorous, quietly wrenching Greek drama". Peter Bradshaw characterised the film as "an angular, complex, absorbing and obscurely troubling movie".

Promotion
A promotional picture for the film, where the tongues of two women meet, was censored on Facebook, but Facebook now hosts a profile for the film in which the picture is allowed.

Awards

See also
 List of submissions to the 84th Academy Awards for Best Foreign Language Film
 List of Greek submissions for the Academy Award for Best Foreign Language Film

References

External links
 Official website
 Official Facebook page
 
 
 

2010 films
2010 drama films
2010s Greek-language films
Films set in Greece
Greek drama films
Films directed by Athina Rachel Tsangari